William J. Cooper (February 19, 1915 – March 10, 1985), nicknamed "Flash", was an American Negro league catcher in the 1930s and 1940s.

A native of Sumter, South Carolina, Cooper attended Morris Brown College. He made his Negro leagues debut in 1937 with the Atlanta Black Crackers. He went on to play for the Philadelphia Stars, served in the US Army during World War II, and finished his career in 1946 with the New York Black Yankees. Cooper died in Philadelphia, Pennsylvania in 1985 at age 70.

References

External links
 and Baseball-Reference Black Baseball stats and Seamheads

1915 births
1985 deaths
Atlanta Black Crackers players
New York Black Yankees players
Philadelphia Stars players
Indianapolis ABCs players
African Americans in World War II
United States Army personnel of World War II
Baseball catchers
African-American United States Army personnel